Kedah Darul Aman Football Club is a football club based in Alor Setar, Kedah, that competes in the Malaysia Super League. They are the only team in the history of Malaysian football to have won two trebles: in 2006–07 and 2007–08. The club is managed by Darulaman Football Club Sdn Bhd.

History
The football team was founded in 1924 by Tunku Yaacob ibni Sultan Abdul Hamid Halim Shah as president, though they only had limited success until the appointment of Ahmad Basri Akil as manager in 1985. Under Ahmad Basri Akil, the club qualified for six Malaysia Cup final matches in a seven-year period between 1987 and 1993; and won two Malaysia Cup titles, one league title and one FA Cup title.

The club experienced a lean period in the 1980s and 1990s, but enjoyed a revival in the new millennium by achieving back-to-back domestic trebles under Azraai Khor. The club also reached 111th position in IFFHS club world ranking between 1 August 2007 to 31 July 2008. However, the club experienced a dip in performances thereafter as a result of the loss of their influential import players; including Nelson San Martín, Cornelius Huggins and Marlon James. Problems with the new management team also led to Azraai Khor's departure.

The club were relegated to the second-tier of Malaysian football, the Malaysian Premier League, after losing 3–2 in the playoff final to Sri Pahang in a penalty shootout during the 2012 Super League season. Marijo Tot was hired to replace Wan Jamak in an attempt to bring the club back to Malaysia Super League during the 2013 Premier League season, which also saw the return of former Kedah Darul Aman's talisman, Nelson San Martín. In the 2014 season the club signed Billy Mehmet, who made an immediate impact. He helped the club reach the semi-final of the Malaysia Cup, winning the first leg 3–1, but ultimately lost the second leg 5–1. Billy Mehmet ended the season as the club's top goal scorer in the Malaysia Premier League as well as the club's top goal scorer in all competitions. He was also the second highest goal scorer in all competitions at all levels in Malaysian professional football.

Prior to the 2021 season, the club changed its name from Kedah FA to Kedah Darul Aman F.C.

Crest and colours
Kedah Darul Aman Football Club's traditional colours are red and black, but the home kit's colours have been green and yellow since 1988. The colours were the result of the former Kedah Football Association Deputy President, Ahmad Basri Akil's request for a different set of colours for the home kit. The colours of green and yellow were chosen as they referenced the state's nickname of Jelapang Padi or Paddy field.

The current club crest were announced by Ahmad Basri Akil alongside the club's official colours of green and yellow in 1988. Green dominates the background; the side of the crest shows 11 joint bordered lines which signify the 11 districts of the Kedah state. At the centre of the crest is a ball and Allamanda flowers; as the flower is green and yellow in colour, with the team motto written in yellow.

Stadium

The club is currently based at the all-seater Darul Aman Stadium, located in Alor Setar, Kedah. It has a capacity of 32,387 seats and was opened in 1962.

Club culture

Supporters

The song Biar Jasa Jadi Kenangan, once again idealised and written by Ahmad Basri Akil and famously recorded by a Malaysian musician Freddie Fernandez, is the anthem of the club, and has been sung by the crowd since 9 September 1987 after the club reached their first Malaysia Cup semi-final match since 1940. This famous song is sung by the club's fanatic fans to boost their beloved players' morale. The well-known and popular chants among the club supporters is Pulun Kedah Pulun. It is use since late 80's as "words of spirit" during and off the game, and as the slogan among supporters. It was inspired by the idea from Abdul Rashid Fadzil, the former Head of Kedah Fan Club.

Kit manufacturer and shirt sponsor

Club record

Accurate as of 2021

Note:

Pld = Played, W = Won, D = Drawn, L = Lost, F = Goals for, A = Goals against, D = Goal difference, Pts= Points, Pos = Position

Source:

Honours

Domestic

League
Division 1/Premier 1/Super League (3): 1993, 2006–07, 2007–08
Runners-up (6): 1994, 1996, 1997, 2003, 2020, 2021
Division 2/Premier 2/Premier League (4): 1992, 2002, 2005–06, 2015
Runners-up (1): 2005

Cup
Malaysia FA Cup (5): 1996, 2007, 2008, 2017, 2019
Runners-up (1): 2010
Malaysia Cup (5): 1990, 1993, 2007, 2008, 2016
Runners-up (9): 1940, 1987, 1988, 1989, 1992, 2004, 2015, 2017, 2019
Malaysian Charity Cup (3): 1991, 1994, 2017
Runners-up (6): 1997, 2008, 2009, 2018, 2020, 2021

Youth
Malaysian President's Cup (3): 1991, 2000, 2003
Runners-up (1): 2018
Malaysian Youth Cup (1): 2017

Double

Treble

Kedah Darul Aman's former assistant coach Muhamad Radhi Mat Din said,

Continental record
All results (home and away) list Darulaman FC's goal tally first.

Performance in AFC competitions

AFC Champions League: 1 appearance
2020: Play-off round 
AFC Cup: 2 appearances
2008: Quarter-final
2009: Round of 16

Rivalries
The Penang-based Penang FC are the biggest rivals of the club. The club's fans consider their main rivalries to be with (in order) Penang, Perlis and Perak. Matches against fellow northern region sides Tambun Tulang, Kuala Muda Naza, Kedah United, Sungai Ara, PBAPP, SDMS Kepala Batas and Perak YBU have only taken place intermittently, due to the clubs often being in separate divisions.

Northern Region Derby
Northern Region Derby is the name given to football matches that involves Kedah Darul Aman and Penang. Both them are located in the north of Malaysia. Bandaraya Stadium and Darul Aman Stadium are packed by fans from both clubs during the derby matches. The match usually creates a lively atmosphere, with numerous banners unfolded before the start of the game.

Friendships
Although the club's main rivals mostly are from the northern region of Malaysia, especially Penang, but there is also a strong supporter of friendship with Perlis and there are good relations with the fans of Penang and Perak  "This is Utara", which means "This is the north", is a slogan which shows their good friendships among the clubs.

Players

First-team squad

Under-23s

Under-19s

Head coaches

Club officials

Senior officials

Team officials

See also

List of Kedah FA honours and achievements
List of Kedah FA players

References

External links
 
  of Kedah League
 Galerihijaukuning.com

 
Malaysia Super League clubs
Football clubs in Malaysia
Football associations in Malaysia
Malaysia Cup winners
1924 establishments in British Malaya
Sports organizations established in 1924